SM Tauras-Vilniaus kolegija (formerly Eastcon AG Vilnius) is a women's team handball club from Vilnius, Lithuania. Currently club is competing in Lithuanian Handball League.

Accomplishments

LWHL:1st
1999, 2005, 2008

References 

Lithuanian handball clubs
Sport in Vilnius
Lithuanian Women's Handball League clubs